Jasper Lake may refer to:

 Lake Jasper, a lake in the South West area of Western Australia.
 Jasper Lake (Alberta), a lake located in the Rockies of Jasper National Park, Canada. 
 Tremont (microarchitecture), a CPU microarchitecture including the Jasper Lake platform.